Seim, or Mende, is a Sepik language of Yirwondi ward and surroundings in Mawase Rural LLG, Sandaun Province, Papua New Guinea.

References

External links 
 

Nukuma languages
Languages of Sandaun Province